The Revelation Space series is a book series created by Alastair Reynolds that debuted with the novel Revelation Space in 2000. The fictional universe it is set in is used as the setting for a number of his novels and stories. Its fictional history follows the human species through various conflicts from the relatively near future (roughly 2200) to approximately 40,000 AD (all the novels to date are set between 2427 and 2858, although certain stories extend beyond this period). It takes its name from Revelation Space (2000), which was the first published novel set in the universe.

Universe
The Revelation Space universe is a fictional universe which was set in a future version of our world, with the addition of a number of extraterrestrial species and advanced technologies that are not necessarily grounded in current science. It is, nonetheless, somewhat "harder" than most examples of space opera, relying to a considerable extent on science Reynolds believes to be possible; in particular, faster-than-light travel is largely absent. Reynolds has said he prefers to keep the science in his fiction plausible, but he will adopt science he believes to be impossible when it is necessary for the story.

The name "Revelation Space universe" has been used by Alastair Reynolds in both the introductory text in the collections Diamond Dogs, Turquoise Days and Galactic North, and also on several editions of the novels set in the universe. He considered calling it the 'Exordium universe' after a key plot device, but found that the name was already in use.

While a great deal of science fiction reflects either very optimistic or dystopian visions of the human future, the Revelation Space universe is notable in that human societies have not developed to either positive or negative extremes. Instead, despite their dramatically advanced technology, they are similar to those of today in terms of their moral ambiguity and mixture of cruelty and decency, corruption and opportunity.

The Revelation Space universe contains elements of Lovecraftian horror, with one posthuman entity stating explicitly that some things in the universe are fundamentally beyond human or transhuman understanding. Nevertheless, the main storyline is essentially optimistic, with humans continuing to survive even in a universe that seems fundamentally hostile to intelligent life.

The name "Revelation Space" appears in the novel of the same name during Philip Lascaille's account of his visit to Lascaille's Shroud, an anomalous region of the local universe. Lascaille says that "the key" to something momentous "was explained to me [. . .] while I was in Revelation Space."

Chronology 
The chronology of the Revelation Space universe extends to roughly one billion years into the past, when the "Dawn War" — a galaxy-spanning conflict over the availability of various natural resources — resulted in almost all sentient life in the galaxy being wiped out. One race of survivors, later termed the Inhibitors, having converted itself to machine form, predicted that the impending Andromeda–Milky Way collision, roughly 3 billion years in our future, may severely damage the capacity of either galaxy to support life. Consequently, they planned to adjust the positions of stars in order to limit the damage the collision would cause. Also central to the Inhibitor project was the eradication of all species above a certain technological level until the crisis was over, as they believed no organic species would be capable of co-operating on such a large-scale project (an in-universe solution to the Fermi paradox). Whilst they were relatively successful, certain advanced species were able to hide from Inhibitor forces, or even fight back.

In human history, during the 21st and 22nd centuries numerous wars occurred, and a flotilla of generation ships were deployed to colonise a planet orbiting the star 61 Cygni (this becomes a major segment of the plot of Chasm City). The flotilla was later to reach a planet termed Sky's Edge, which was to be embroiled in war until human civilisation there was eradicated.

Meanwhile, in the Solar System in 2190, the Conjoiners emerged as a result of increased experimentation with neural implants. In response, the Coalition for Neural Purity was formed, opposed to the Conjoiners. Nevil Clavain fought on the side of the Coalition in the ensuing war, but defected later on after being betrayed. Clavain, and the Conjoiners, succeeded in escaping the Solar System and left for surrounding stars.

For the next few centuries, the so-called Belle Epoque, humanity enjoyed a period of relative peace and prosperity, with several planets being colonised. The most successful planet of all was Yellowstone, a planet orbiting the star Epsilon Eridani, site of the Glitter Band / Rust Belt and Chasm City. Technologies developed included the Conjoiner Drive, a gift from the Conjoiners (who resumed contact with humanity at an unknown time), advanced nanotechnology, and numerous other devices. With the exception of an attempted takeover of the Glitter Band, no major incidents affected humanity during this time.

The Belle Epoque was terminated by the advent of the Melding Plague in 2510, a nanotechnological virus that destroyed all other nanotechnology it came into contact with. Only the Conjoiners were unaffected by this disaster, which devastated the civilisation around Yellowstone. War between the Demarchists and Conjoiners erupted as a result of the plague.

Meanwhile, activities around a far-flung human colony on the planet Resurgam, orbiting the star Delta Pavonis, inadvertently attracted the attention of the Inhibitors. The Conjoiners, also made aware of this event, sent Clavain to recover the exceedingly powerful "Cache Weapons" from this system (said weapons having been stolen from the Conjoiners centuries before) that could be used to fend off the Inhibitors while the Conjoiners escaped. Clavain instead defected from the Conjoiners, intending to use the weapons to protect all of humanity. Skade, another Conjoiner, was sent to stop him and recover the weapons. They fought around the Resurgam system, with Clavain and his allies eventually obtaining the weapons. Clavain's ally Remontoire agreed to seek out alien assistance from the Hades Matrix, a nearby alien computer disguised as a neutron star, whilst Clavain sheltered refugees from Resurgam on another planet, later termed Ararat.

Remontoire returned in 2675, only a few days after Clavain's death at the hands of Skade, who had arrived with him. Remontoire and his allies were now at war with the Inhibitors, assisted by alien technology obtained from Hades. Even so, it was realised that the humans would not last indefinitely, and Clavain's people, now led by Scorpio, decided to seek out the mysterious "Shadows": a race believed to be near a moon called Hela, site of a theocracy. Aura, daughter of Ana Khouri (an ally of Remontoire) infiltrated the theocracy under the pseudonym Rashmika Els. After considerable conflict, Scorpio and Aura realised that contacting the Shadows was inadvisable. They instead contacted the Nestbuilders, who provided them with weapons capable of defeating the Inhibitors. As such, the Inhibitors were effectively eradicated from human space, with buffer zones and frontiers established to keep them at bay.

Humanity then enjoyed a second, 400-year-long golden age. After this, however, came the Greenfly outbreak, in which human civilisation was destroyed by a rogue terraforming system of human origin that destroyed planets and converted them to millions of orbiting, vegetation-filled habitats. The Greenfly began to subsume most of human space, with all efforts to stop them failing. The storyline of the Revelation Space universe thus far concludes with humanity leaving the Milky Way galaxy in an attempt to set up a new civilisation elsewhere.

Books and stories set in the universe
All short stories and novellas in this universe to date are collected in Galactic North and Diamond Dogs, Turquoise Days, with the exception of "Monkey Suit", "The Last Log of the Lachrimosa", "Night Passage", "Open and Shut", and "Plague Music".

The Inhibitor Sequence
 Revelation Space. London: Gollancz, 2000. .
 Redemption Ark. London: Gollancz, 2002. .
 Absolution Gap. London: Gollancz, 2003. .
 Inhibitor Phase. London: Gollancz, 2021. .

Prefect Dreyfus Emergencies
 The Prefect. London: Gollancz, 2007, . (Re-released as Aurora Rising in 2017)
 Elysium Fire. London: Gollancz, 2018, .
 Machine Vendetta. London: Gollancz, 2023, . (Forthcoming, Sept 2023)

Standalone
 Chasm City. London: Gollancz, 2001. .

Short fiction
 "Dilation Sleep" — originally published in Interzone #39 (September 1990); reprinted in Galactic North
 "A Spy in Europa" — originally published in Interzone #120 (June 1997); reprinted in The Year's Best Science Fiction: Fifteenth Annual Collection (1998), Gardner Dozois, ed.; and in Galactic North; and posted free online at Infinity Plus
 "Galactic North" — originally published in Interzone #145 (July 1999); reprinted in Space Soldiers (2001), Jack Dann and Gardner Dozois, eds.; and in The Year's Best Science Fiction: Seventeenth Annual Collection (2000), Gardner Dozois, ed.; and in Hayakawa's SF magazine; and in Galactic North
 "Monkey Suit" — originally published in Death Ray #20 (July 2009); reprinted in Deep Navigation
 "The Last Log of the Lachrimosa" — originally published in Subterranean Online (July 2014); reprinted in Beyond the Aquila Rift 
 "Night Passage" — originally published in the SF anthology Infinite Stars by Titan Books (October 2017)
 "Open and Shut" — A Prefect Dreyfus Emergency short story, originally published on the Gollancz website (January 2018)
 "Plague Music" — originally published in Belladonna Nights and Other Stories, Subterranean Press (2021)

Novellas
 "Great Wall of Mars" — originally published in Spectrum SF #1 (February 2000); reprinted in The Year's Best Science Fiction: Eighteenth Annual Collection (2001), Gardner Dozois, ed.; and in Galactic North and in Beyond the Aquila Rift
 "Glacial" — originally published in Spectrum SF #5 (March 2001); reprinted in The Year's Best Science Fiction: Nineteenth Annual Collection (2002), Gardner Dozois, ed.; and in Galactic North
 Diamond Dogs — originally published as a chapbook from PS Publishing (2001); reprinted in Infinities (2002), Peter Crowther, ed.; and in Diamond Dogs, Turquoise Days and in Beyond the Aquila Rift
 Turquoise Days — originally published as a chapbook from Golden Gryphon (2002, no ISBN); reprinted in The Year's Best Science Fiction: Twentieth Annual Collection (2003), Gardner Dozois, ed.; and in Best of the Best Volume 2: 20 Years of the Year's Best Short Science Fiction Novels (2007), Gardner Dozois, ed.; and in Diamond Dogs, Turquoise Days
 "Weather" — originally published in Galactic North (2006); reprinted in Beyond the Aquila Rift
 "Grafenwalder's Bestiary" — originally published in Galactic North (2006)
 "Nightingale" — originally published in Galactic North (2006); reprinted in The Year's Best Science Fiction: Twenty-Fourth Annual Collection (2006), Gardner Dozois, ed.

Stories in chronological order

References

External links

Book series introduced in 2000
Future history
Revelation Space
Science fiction book series
Space opera
Fictional universes
Artificial intelligence in fiction
Nanotechnology in fiction
Fiction about consciousness transfer
Fiction set in the 7th millennium or beyond